Newborn is a town in Newton County, Georgia, United States. The population was 696 at the 2010 census.

History
After hearing a sermon by 19th-century preacher Samuel Porter Jones, the town adopted the name "Newborn", after the concept of born again in Evangelical Christianity. The Georgia General Assembly incorporated Newborn as a town in 1894.

Geography

Newborn is located at  (33.516980, -83.694572).

Demographics

As of the census of 2000, there were 520 people, 181 households, and 148 families living in the town. The racial makeup of the town was 71.35% White, 25.58% African American, 0.96% Native American, 1.35% from other races, and 0.77% from two or more races. Hispanic or Latino of any race were 2.88% of the population.

There were 181 households, out of which 42.5% had children under the age of 18 living with them, 57.5% were married couples living together, 18.8% had a female householder with no husband present, and 17.7% were non-families. 16.6% of all households were made up of individuals, and 8.3% had someone living alone who was 65 years of age or older. The average household size was 2.87 and the average family size was 3.17.

In the town, the population was spread out, with 28.8% under the age of 18, 9.0% from 18 to 24, 30.2% from 25 to 44, 23.8% from 45 to 64, and 8.1% who were 65 years of age or older. The median age was 32 years. For every 100 females, there were 94.8 males. For every 100 females age 18 and over, there were 85.9 males.

The median income for a household in the town was $37,692, and the median income for a family was $39,000. Males had a median income of $36,875 versus $24,904 for females. The per capita income for the town was $14,210. About 7.9% of families and 10.8% of the population were below the poverty line, including 10.5% of those under age 18 and 10.3% of those age 65 or over.

References

Towns in Newton County, Georgia
Towns in Georgia (U.S. state)